The 2012 Corpus Christi mayoral election was held on November 6, 2012 to elect the mayor of Corpus Christi, Texas. It saw the election of Nelda Martinez.

Results

References 

Corpus Christi
Corpus Christi
Mayoral elections in Corpus Christi, Texas
Non-partisan elections